Temple Building may refer to:

in Canada
Temple Building (Toronto)

in the United States
Temple Building (Marlborough, Massachusetts), listed on the NRHP in Massachusetts 
Temple Block Building, Kansas City, Missouri, listed on the NRHP in Jackson County, Missouri
Temple Building (Rochester, New York), a tall building

See also
Masonic Temple Building (disambiguation)
Elks Temple Building
Temple Theater (disambiguation)